Victor Desmond Courtney (27 May 1894 – 1 December 1970) was a Western Australian journalist and newspaper editor.  From small beginnings in a partnership (with Jack Simons) in a weekly sporting newspaper, The Call, through to a Saturday-evening paper, The Mirror, Courtney ended up as the managing director of The Sunday Times and owner of a network of thirty regional newspapers.

Works
 (1941) Random Rhymes, Perth, the author.
 (1941) The man from Marble Bar [poem].First line: Satan sat by the fires of hell. in Random rhymes, 1941, p. 16
reprinted in 	Grono, William (ed) (1988) Margins : a West Coast selection of poetry, 1829-1988Fremantle, W.A.  Fremantle Arts Centre Press. . page 200.
 (1946)  Parlez vous [poem]. (first line) 'The reelers are at dinner tonight'.
 (1948) Cold is the Marble, Melbourne : Jindyworobak.
 (1956)  All I May Tell, 	Sydney : Shakespeare Head Press.
 The Life Story of J. J. Simons, 1961.
 Perth—and All This!, 1962.

Further reading
 Davidson, Ron, (1994) High jinks at the hot pool : Mirror reflects the life of a city  Fremantle, W.A. Fremantle Arts Centre Press.  (pbk.) former title was The Mirror.

External links
 Courtney's Australian Dictionary of Biography entry. - print version at — Victor Courtney — biography of journalist. Australian dictionary of biography, Vol. 13, p. 514.

1894 births
1970 deaths
Journalists from Western Australia
Port Stephens Council